The Rough and the Smooth (US-title: Portrait of a Sinner) is a 1959 British drama film directed by Robert Siodmak and starring Nadja Tiller, Tony Britton, William Bendix and Natasha Parry. The screenplay concerns an archaeologist who has an affair with a German woman, putting his engagement to another woman in jeopardy.

The film was shot at the MGM-British Studios and on location around London.

It was based on the 1951 novel by Robin Maugham. It was distributed in Germany by Gloria Film. In 1961 it was given an American release by American International Pictures.

Plot
In late 1950s London an upper-class archeologist  Mike Thompson (Tony Britton) by chance meets a mysterious German woman Ila Hansen (Nadja Tiller) in a bar; later they share a taxi and he takes her back to the house where he lives with his parents. They embark on a torrid love affair during which she constantly lies and deceives him and threatens to ruin his long-term relationship with his fiancee, Margaret Goreham (Natasha Parry).

Cast
 Nadja Tiller as Ila Hansen  
 Tony Britton as Mike Thompson  
 William Bendix as Reg Barker  
 Natasha Parry as Margaret Goreham  
 Norman Wooland as David Fraser  
 Donald Wolfit as Lord Drewell  
 Tony Wright as Jack  
 Adrienne Corri as Jane Buller  
 Joyce Carey as Mrs. Thompson  
 John Welsh as Dr. Thompson  
 Martin Miller as Piggy  
 Michael Ward as Headwaiter  
 Edward Chapman as Willy Catch  
 Norman Pierce as Barman  
 Beatrice Varley as Hotel Manageress
 Geoffrey Bayldon as Ransom

Reception
According to Kinematograph Weekly the film performed "better than average" at the British box office in 1959.

References

External links

1959 films
1959 drama films
1950s English-language films
British drama films
Films about infidelity
Films directed by Robert Siodmak
Films scored by Douglas Gamley
Films set in London
Films based on British novels
Films shot at MGM-British Studios
1950s British films